1083 Salvia is a stony background asteroid from the inner regions of the asteroid belt. It was discovered on 26 January 1928, by astronomer Karl Reinmuth at the Heidelberg Observatory in southwest Germany. It was named after the flowering plant Salvia (sage).

Orbit and classification 

Located in the region of the Flora family, Salvia is a non-family asteroid of the main belt's background population when applying the hierarchical clustering method to its proper orbital elements. It orbits the Sun in the inner asteroid belt at a distance of 1.9–2.8 AU once every 3 years and 7 months (1,298 days; semi-major axis of 2.33 AU). Its orbit has an eccentricity of 0.18 and an inclination of 5° with respect to the ecliptic.

Naming 

This minor planet was named after the flowering plant Salvia (sage), a genus of herbs or shrubs that belong to the mint family. The official naming citation was mentioned in The Names of the Minor Planets by Paul Herget in 1955.

Reinmuth's flowers 

Due to his many discoveries, Karl Reinmuth submitted a large list of 66 newly named asteroids in the early 1930s. This list also contained a sequence of 28 asteroids, starting with 1054 Forsytia, that were all named after plants, in particular flowering plants (also see list of minor planets named after animals and plants).

Physical characteristics 

Salvia is an assumed stony S-type asteroid, which corresponds to its observed albedo (see below).

Rotation period and poles 

In March 1992, a rotational lightcurve of Salvia was obtained from photometric observations by Polish astronomer Wiesław Wiśniewski. Lightcurve analysis gave a well-defined rotation period of 4.23 hours with a brightness amplitude of 0.61 magnitude. A 2016-published lightcurve, using modeled photometric data from the Lowell Photometric Database, gave a concurring period of  hours, as well as two spin axis of (165.0°, −59.0°) and (358.0°, −58.0°) in ecliptic coordinates (λ, β).

Diameter and albedo 

According to the survey carried out by the NEOWISE mission of NASA's Wide-field Infrared Survey Explorer (WISE), Salvia measures between 8.927 and 10.283 kilometers in diameter and its surface has an albedo between 0.2103 and 0.2184. The Collaborative Asteroid Lightcurve Link adopts Petr Pravec's revised WISE data, that is an albedo of 0.2103 and a diameter of 10.28 kilometers based on an absolute magnitude of 12.25.

References

External links 
 Lightcurve Database Query (LCDB), at www.minorplanet.info
 Dictionary of Minor Planet Names, Google books
 Asteroids and comets rotation curves, CdR – Geneva Observatory, Raoul Behrend
 Discovery Circumstances: Numbered Minor Planets (1)-(5000) – Minor Planet Center
 
 

001083
Discoveries by Karl Wilhelm Reinmuth
Named minor planets
19280126